Günece, historically Havarin, is a village in the Elbeyli District, Kilis Province, Turkey. The village is inhabited by Abdals of the Maya Sekenler tribe and had a population of 37 in 2022.

References

Villages in Elbeyli District